Mohamed Seif El-Nasr (born 5 September 1983) is an Egyptian volleyball player. He competed in the men's tournament at the 2008 Summer Olympics.

References

1983 births
Living people
Egyptian men's volleyball players
Olympic volleyball players of Egypt
Volleyball players at the 2008 Summer Olympics
Sportspeople from Cairo